Enteucha acetosae, the pygmy sorrel moth, is a moth of the family Nepticulidae found in Europe. It is one of the smallest moths in the world with some having a wingspan of only 3mm. The larvae mine the leaves of docks (Rumex species), leaving bright red tissue around the mines.

Life history
The wingspan is 3–4 mm. (one of the world's smallest moths). The head is fuscous to blackish. Antennal eyecaps whitish. Forewings shining bronze; a broad shining silvery fascia at 3/4, preceded by a fuscous suffusion apical area beyond this rather dark purplish-fuscous. Hindwings grey. 
 There are two to three generations in western and central Europe.

Ovum
Eggs are laid on the underside of common sorrel (Rumex acetosa), sheep's sorrel (Rumex acetosella) and French sorrel (Rumex scutatus).

Larvae

Larvae are pale amber/yellow with a greenish gut. The head is pale amber with a faint brown tinge. They mine the leaves of their host plant. The mine consists of a narrow, hardly widening spiral corridor that makes about five whole or half circles closely around the egg. The leaf tissue around the mine is intensely reddened and there are often several mines in a single leaf. The frass is deposited in a narrow central line.

Pupa
Pupation is outside of the mine in a white cocoon, spun on detritius, which turns yellow as it ages.

Distribution
The moth is found in Europe, from Sweden to the Pyrenees, Alps and Serbia and from Ireland to Romania.

Etymology
Enteucha acetosae was described by the English entomologist, Henry Tibbats Stainton in 1854, from a specimen found in Dublin, Ireland. It was originally placed in the genus Nepticula, moved to Johanssonia and at present, Enteucha; which was raised by Edward Meyrick in 1915. The specific name acetosae refers to one of the food plants Rumex acetosa.

References

External links
 Swedish Moths
  Euteucha acetosae images at  Consortium for the Barcode of Life

Nepticulidae
Leaf miners
Moths described in 1854
Moths of Europe
Taxa named by Henry Tibbats Stainton